The archaeological site of Sabratha is an excavated Numidian and later Roman city situed near present-day Sabratha, Libya. 

It was a Phoenician trading-post that served as an outlet for the products of the African hinterland, and later part of the short-lived Numidian Kingdom of Massinissa before being Romanized and rebuilt in the 2nd and 3rd centuries A.D.

History 
Sabratha, on the coast of Libya 40 km, to the west of modern Tripoli, was founded by Phoenician settlers in the sixth or fifth century B.C. and grew to be a prosperous town during much of the Roman period, though it did not long survive the coming of the Arabs in the seventh century A.D. Today it ranks alongside Lepcis Magna as one of the major classical sites of the region. The' modern exploration of the ruins was begun in 1926 during the Italian colonial period and in the ensuing years much of the heart of the town was laid bare. During the period of the British Military Administration immediately after the end of the Second World War, three seasons of work were carried out by a British expedition.

Damage in 2018 

Damage resulting from the clashes in 2018

Sources

References 

World Heritage Sites in Libya
Archaeological sites in Libya
Tourism in Libya
Phoenician colonies in Libya